Turkey Town is a ghost town in Cherokee County, in the U.S. state of Alabama.

History
The community grew up around the Cherokee town Turkeytown.
A post office called Turkey Town was established in 1828, and remained in operation until it was discontinued in 1861. The community was named after the village, which was named in honor of the Cherokee chief Little Turkey.

References

Geography of Cherokee County, Alabama
Ghost towns in Alabama
1828 establishments in Alabama
Ghost towns in the United States
Ghost towns in North America
Towns in the United States
Towns in Alabama